The Upper American River Project (UARP) is a hydroelectric system operated by the Sacramento Municipal Utility District (SMUD) of Sacramento, California in the United States.

The system consists of 11 dams and eight powerhouses that tap the upper tributaries of the American River drainage in the Sierra Nevada for power generation. Total installed capacity is over 687 MW, producing 1.8 billion KWh annually, enough for 20 percent of the city's electricity needs.

The project mainly utilizes water from the South Fork American River and its tributaries, although some water is drawn from the Rubicon River, a tributary of the Middle Fork American River.

History
The UARP was authorized on August 28, 1957 by an act of the Federal Power Commission. SMUD began construction in September of that year, and the first power generation from UARP came online at Jaybird Powerhouse on May 1, 1961. Most of the project facilities were completed by 1967. The Loon Lake Powerhouse was completed in 1971, and Jones Fork Powerhouse was finished in 1985.

Environmental impacts include the prevention of fish passage by the project's dams, which segment parts of the upper South Fork American River, the Rubicon River and their tributaries.

Overview
Water is diverted from the Rubicon River to a storage reservoir, Loon Lake, from which it is released through the Loon Lake Powerhouse to Gerle Creek. This water is intercepted and diverted into Silver Creek, a tributary of the South Fork American River, flowing through the Robbs Peak Powerhouse into Union Valley Reservoir, the project's principal reservoir. Water from Ice House Reservoir also enters Union Valley via the Jones Fork Powerhouse.

From Union Valley, water flows through the Union Valley Powerhouse to Junction Reservoir, then through Jaybird Powerhouse to Camino Reservoir, both on Silver Creek. The water then enters a penstock that feeds the Camino Powerhouse above Slab Creek Reservoir on the South Fork American River. From there, water is sent through a final tunnel to White Rock Powerhouse, located on the upper end of Chili Bar Reservoir also on the South Fork.

List of facilities

† indicates a diversion dam

References

American River (California)
Hydroelectric power plants in California
Sacramento Municipal Utility District
Eldorado National Forest